Psychrobacter pulmonis is a Gram-negative, catalase- and oxidase-positive, strictly aerobic, nonmotile bacterium of the genus Psychrobacter, which was isolated from the lungs of lambs in Zaragoza in Spain.
 It is coccus-shaped; the type strain is S-606T (=CECT 5989T =CCUG 46240T).

References

Further reading

External links

LPSN
Type strain of Psychrobacter pulmonis at BacDive -  the Bacterial Diversity Metadatabase

Moraxellaceae
Bacteria described in 2003